Kalaignar TV Private Limited (கலைஞர் டிவி பிரைவேட் லிமிடெட்) is an Tamil mass media company headquartered in Chennai, Tamil Nadu. Established on 14 April 1992 by M. Karunanidhi, it owns a variety of television channels in Tamil language and also radio station. Kalaignar TV launched its paid channel on 7 September 2022.

History
Kalaignar TV was founded by Raj TV in 2007 as a joint venture between was announced with much fanfare at the peak of the tensions between TN chief minister M. Karunanidhi, Dravida Munnetra Kazhagam party and the Kalanithi Maran brothers. On 6 June 2007, While the M. Karunanidhi’s wife MK Dayalu owns 60% in Kalaignar TV, the new company formed to launch the proposed channel, his daughter and Rajya Sabha member Kanimozhi owns 20%. The channel owned by M. Karunanidhi’s family.

On 15 September 2007 Kalaignar TV Private Limited launched Kalaignar TV  is a general entertainment channel and Kalaignar Seithigal, is a 24-hour news channel. On 22 February 2008, it launched a music channel named Isaiaruvi.
On September 2009, its sibling channel Sirippoli TV was launched, which airs non-stop Comedy channel.

In 26 January 2012, launched Murasu TV, is a 24-hour classic movie and classic music channel.

Owned channels

On air channels

Defunct channels

References 

2007 establishments in Tamil Nadu
Mass media in Tamil Nadu
Television networks in India
Television stations in Chennai
Television channels and stations established in 2007
Television broadcasting companies of India
Mass media companies of India
Broadcasting